Did It for the Party is the sixth studio album by American country music duo Big & Rich. It was released on September 15, 2017 via Big & Rich Records/Thirty Tigers. The album's lead single is "California".

Content
Group member John Rich told Billboard that "there’s some 80s Country on there, and also some Eagles west-coast Country kind of stuff. It’s also a really fun song to sing. When the fans learn it, they sing it at the top of their lungs."

Lead single "California" was originally recorded by Tim McGraw on his album Damn Country Music, and his version features Big & Rich on backing vocals.

Critical reception
Giving it 2.5 out of 5 stars, Stephen Thomas Erlewine of Allmusic thought that the album had a sense of "melancholy" that was "undone by the duo doubling down on polish while halfheartedly insisting on living it up on the margins." He thought "Wake Up Wanting You" and "Smoke in Her Eyes" were "ingratiating" but said that "the sentimental moments are too sticky".

Commercial performance
The album debuted at No. 2 on Billboard's Top Country Albums chart, with 26,000 copies sold in the first week (27,000 including streams and tracks). It has sold 38,700 copies in the United States as of November 2017.

Track listing

Charts

References

2017 albums
Big & Rich albums
Albums produced by John Rich